Herbert Samuel Chang (born 2 July 1952) is a former West Indian cricketer who played in one Test match in 1979.

Born in Jamaica of Chinese extraction, Chang was a diminutive left-handed batsman who toured England with the West Indies Young Cricketers in 1970 before playing 48 first-class matches and 18 List A matches for Jamaica between 1973 and 1983. He earned his first and only Test cap for the West Indies against India at Madras in January 1979, becoming the second player of Chinese descent to represent the West Indies.

Chang participated in the first West Indies rebel tour of apartheid South Africa in 1983, playing in four unofficial One Day Internationals. He was subsequently banned for life by the West Indies Cricket Board, although the ban was lifted in 1989.

Following his ostracism from cricket in the West Indies, he suffered a nervous breakdown, and today lives with family in Kingston.

References

1952 births
Living people
West Indies Test cricketers
Jamaican cricketers
Jamaican people of Chinese descent
Jamaica cricketers
Cricketers from Kingston, Jamaica